This is a list of hospitals in South Africa.

Eastern Cape

Buffalo City

Cecilia Makiwane Hospital (Mdantsane)
Duncan Village Day Hospital
Fort Grey TB Hospital
Frere Hospital
Life Beacon Bay Hospital
Life East London Private Hospital
Life St Dominic’s Hospital
Life St James Hospital
Life St Marks Clinic
Nkqubela Chest Hospital (Mdantsane)

Port Elizabeth

 Nurture Aurora Rehabilitation Hospital (Private)
Dora Nginza Hospital
Elizabeth Donkin Hospital
Empilweni Hospital
Jose Pearson TB Hospital
Life Hunterscraig Private Hospital
Life Mercantile Private Hospital
Life St George’s Hospital
Livingstone Hospital
Netcare Greenacres Hospital
Nightingale Subacute Hospital
Oasim Private Hospital
Port Elizabeth Provincial Hospital
Westways Private Hospital

 Matatiele
Taylor Bequest Memorial Hospital 
Matatiele Private Hospital

Mthatha
Zamakuhle Private Hospital
Bedford Orthopedic Hospital
Life St Mary’s Private Hospital
Mthatha General Hospital
Nelson Mandela Academic Hospital
Sir Henry Eliot Hospital
Bizana
Greenville Hospital (Bizana)
St Patrick's Hospital (Bizana)
Other

Aberdeen Hospital
Adelaide Hospital
Aliwal North Hospital
All Saints Hospital (Ngcobo)
Andries Vosloo Hospital (Somerset East)
B.J. Vorster Hospital (Kareedouw)
Bambisana Hospital (Lusikisiki)
Bedford Hospital
Bhisho Provincial Hospital
Burgersdorp Provincial Hospital
Butterworth Hospital
Cala Provincial Hospital
Canzibe Hospital
Cathcart Provincial Hospital
Cloete Joubert Hospital (Barkly East)
Cofimvaba Hospital
Cradock Provincial Hospital
Netcare Cuyler Hospital (Uitenhage)
Dordrecht Hospital
Dr Maliso Mphele Hospital (Tsolo)
Elliot Provincial Hospital
Empilisweni District Hospital (Sterkspruit)
Fort Beaufort Hospital
Fort England Psychiatric Hospital (Grahamstown)
Frontier Hospital (Queenstown)
Glen Grey Provincial Hospital (Lady Frere)
Grey Provincial Hospital (King William's Town)
Grey Monument Private Clinic (King William's Town)
Hewu Hospital (Whittlesea)
Holy Cross Hospital (Flagstaff)
Humansdorp Hospital
Indwe Hospital
Isilimela Hospital (Port St Johns)
Jamestown Hospital
Komani Psychiatric Hospital (Queenstown)
Komga Hospital
Lady Grey Hospital
Life Isivivana Private Hospital (Humansdorp)
Life Queenstown Private Hospital
Maclear Hospital
Madwaleni Hospital
Madzikane KaZulu Hospital (Mt. Frere)
Margery Parkes TB Hospital (Graaff-Reinet)
Martje Venter Hospital (Tarkastad)
Mary Therese Hospital (Mt. Frere)
Midlands Provincial Hospital (Graaff-Reinet)
Mjanyana Hospital (Ngcobo)
Molteno Hospital
Mount Ayliff Hospital
Nessie Knight Hospital (Qumbu)
Nompumelelo Hospital (Peddie)
Port Alfred Hospital
P.Z. Meyer Hospital (Humansdorp)
Rietvlei Hospital (Umzimkhulu)
Settlers Hospital (Grahamstown)
S.S. Gida Hospital (Keiskamma Hoek)
St Barnabas Hospital (Libode)
St Elizabeth Mission Hospital (Lusikisiki)
St Francis Chronic Hospital (Aliwal North)
St Lucy's Hospital (Tsolo)
Sterkstroom Provincial Hospital
Steynsburg Provincial Hospital
Stutterheim Provincial Hospital
Tafalofefe Hospital (near Butterworth)
Tower Psychiatric Hospital (Fort Beaufort)
Uitenhage Provincial Hospital
Umlamli Hospital (via Sterkspruit)
Victoria Hospital (Alice)
Wilhelm Stahl Provincial Hospital (Middelburg, Eastern Cape)
Willowmore Hospital
Zithulele Hospital

Free State

Bloemfontein

Bloemcare Psychiatric Clinic / Hospital (Private)
Nurture Hillandale Rehabilitation Hospital (Private)
Nurture Woodlands Psychiatric Hospital (Private)  
 Mediclinic Bloemfontein (Private)(Previously HydroMed)
Life Pasteur Hospital (Private)
Life Rosepark Hospital (Private)
Netcare Pelonomi Regional Hospital (Private/public partnership)
Pelonomi Hospital (Public)(Private/public partnership)
Netcare Universitas Hospital (Private/public partnership)
Universitas Academic Hospital (Public)
Free State Psychiatric Complex Bloemfontein (Previously Orange Hospital) (Public)
National District Hospital (Public)

Botshabelo
Botshabelo District Hospital
Busamed (Private)
Emoya Med (Private)

Phuthaditjhaba
Mofumahadi Manapo Regional Hospital (Public)
Elizabeth Ross district Hospital (Private)

Welkom

Bongani Regional Hospital (Public)
Ernest Oppenheimer Hospital (Semi-Private)
Goudveld Regional Hospital
Mediclinic Welkom (Private) (previously Hydromed Hospital)
St Helena Hospital (Private)

Virginia
Katleho Provincial Hospital (previously Virginia Provincial Hospital)

Kroonstad
Kroon Hospital (Private)
Boitumelo Hospital (Public)

Bethlehem

 Phekolong hospital
 Dihlabeng hospital
 Nurture Corona Physical Rehabilitation Hospital (Private)
 Medi-Clinic-Hoogland
 Bethlehem Medical centre

Other

Mafube Hospital (Frankfort)
Mediclinic Hoogland (Bethlehem)
Metsimaholo Hospital (Sasolburg)
Nala District Hospital (Bothaville)
Parys Hospital (Parys)
Sasolburg Provincial Hospital (Sasolburg)
Stoffel Coetzee Provincial Hospital (Smithfield)
Tokollo Hospital (Heilbron)
Thebe hospital (Harrismith)
BusaMed (Harrismith)
Albert Nzula Hospital (Trompsburg)

Gauteng

Benoni
Glynnwood Hospital 
Lakeview Hospital
Linmed Clinic 

Boksburg
Sunshine Hospital
Sunward Park Hospital
Tambo Memorial Hospital (Formerly Boksburg Benoni Hospital)

Johannesburg and surrounds

Abey K Medical Centre
Akeso Randburg Psychiatric Hospital
Akeso Parktown Psychiatric Hospital
Akeso Alberton Psychiatric Hospital
Bedford Gardens Clinic
Charlotte Maxeke Johannesburg Academic Hospital
Chris Hani Baragwanath Hospital
Conner Stone Hospital
Coronation Hospital
Denver Hospital
Gateway House Psychiatric Residence
Helen Joseph Hospital
Leratong Hospital
Marymount Hospital
Mediclinic Morningside
Mediclinic Sandton
Nelson Mandela Children's Hospital
Netcare Bagleyston Hospital
Netcare Garden City Hospital
Netcare Linksfield Hospital
Netcare Linmed Hospital
Netcare Milpark Hospital
Netcare Mulbarton Hospital
Netcare Olivedale Hospital
Netcare Optiklin Eye Hospital
Netcare Park Lane Hospital
Netcare Rand Hospital
Netcare Rehabilitation Hospital
Netcare Rosebank Hospital
Netcare Rosewood Day Hospital
Netcare Sandton Hospital
Netcare Sunninghill Hospital
Netcare Sunward Park Hospital
Netcare Waterfall Hospital in partnership with Phelang Benolo
South Rand Hospital
Tara Psychiatric Hospital
Tembisa Hospital
Wilgeheuwel Hospital
Wits University Donald Gordon Medical Centre

Pretoria

Akasia Private Hospital
Denmar Psychiatric Hospital
Dr George Mukhari Hospital
Eugene Marais Hospital
Faerie Glen Hospital
Jacaranda Hospital
Jubilee Hospital
Kalafong Hospital
Little Company of Mary Hospital
Louis Pasteur Hospital
Mamelodi Hospital
Mediclinic Gynaecological Hospital
Mediclinic Kloof
Mediclinic Heart Hospital
Mediclinic Medforum
Mediclinic Muelmed
Moot General Hospital
Netcare Montana Hospital
Netcare Unitas Hospital
Odi Hospital
Pretoria East Private Hospital
Pretoria Eye Institute
Pretoria Urology Hospital
Pretoria West Hospital
Steve Biko Hospital
Tropicana Hospital
Tshwane District Hospital
Vista Psychiatric Hospital
Weskoppies Psychiatric Hospital
Wilgers Hospital
Zuid-Afrikaans Hospital

Springs
East Rand N17 Private Hospital
Far East Rand Hospital
Springs Parkland Clinic

Vereeniging

Kopanong Hospital
Mediclinic Vereeniging
Midvaal Hospitaal
Sebokeng Hospital

Other 

Arwyp Clinic (Kempton Park)
Bell Street Hospital (Krugersdorp)
Botshelong Empilweni Private Hospital (Vosloorus)
Carstenhof Clinic (Midrand)
Life Flora Hospital (Roodepoort)
Glynnwood Hospital (Benoni)
Krugersdorp Private Hospital (Krugersdorp)
Lenmed Clinic (Lenasia)
Life Blue Cross Hospital (Midrand)
Life Roseacres (Symhurst, Germiston)
Linmed Clinic (Benoni)
Mediclinic Emfuleni (Vanderbijlpark)
Natalspruit Hospital
Pholosong Hospital (Tsakane)
Robinson Hospital (Randfontein)
Union Hospital (Alberton)

KwaZulu-Natal

Ethekwini 

Addington Hospital
Akeso Umhlanga Psychiatric Hospital
Busamed Gateway Private Hospital (uMhlanga)
Busamed Hillcrest Private Hospital 
JMH City Hospital
JMH Ascot Park Hospital
JMH Durdoc Hospital
JMH Isipingo Hospital
Durban Haematology Hospital
Entabeni Private Hospital
Hibiscus Hospital Cato Ridge
Inkosi Albert Luthuli Central Hospital
King Edward VIII Hospital
King George V Hospital, (Durban)
Life Chatsmed Garden Hospital (Chatsworth)
Life Mount Edgecombe Hospital 
Life The Crompton Hospital (Pinetown)
Life Westville Hospital 
Mahatma Gandhi Memorial Hospital
McCord Hospital
Mediclinic Victoria (oThongathi)
Netcare Kingsway Hospital (Amanzimtoti)
Netcare Parklands Hospital (Durban)
Netcare St Augustine's Hospital (Durban)
Netcare uMhlanga Hospital 
Nurture Umhlanga Psychiatric Hospital (Private)
Osindisweni Mission Hospital 
Prince Mshiyeni Hospital
RK Khan Hospital
St Mary's Mission Hospital
Clairwood Hospital
Wentworth Hospital
Al Kadi Private hospital

Greater Pietermaritzburg

Akeso Pietermaritzburg Psychiatric Hospital
Fort Napier Hospital (Forensic Psychiatric)
Grey's Hospital
Midlands Medical Centre
Edendale Hospital
Mediclinic Pietermaritzburg
Eden Gardens Private Hospital (Edendale)
Hilton Private Hospital
Northdale Hospital
St Anne's Hospital
Townhill Psychiatric Hospital

Newcastle
Newcastle Private Hospital
Newcastle Provincial Hospital
Madadeni Provincial Hospital

Empangeni
Ngwelezane Hospital
Lower Umfolozi War Memorial Hospital

Kokstad
Netcare Kokstad Hospital
East Griqualand & Usher Memorial Hospital

South Coast
 Dunstan Farell TB Hospital (Hibberdene)
 Hibiscus Hospital Port Shepstone
 G.J. Crookes Hospital (Scottburgh)
 Port Shepstone Regional Hospital 
 Murchison District Hospital
 Netcare Margate Hospital
 Shelly Beach Hospital 
 St Andrews Hospital (Harding)

Dolphin Coast
General Justice Gizenga Mpanza Regional Hospital (KwaDukuza)
KwaDukuza Private Hospital 
Netcare Alberlito Hospital (Ballito)

Other 

Bethesda Hospital (Jozini)
Charles Johnson Memorial Hospital (Nquthu)
Christ the King Hospital(Ixopo)
Church of Scotland Hospital (Tugela Ferry)
Dundee Hospital
Ekombe Hospital
Eshowe Hospital
Estcourt Hospital
Greytown Hospital
Hlabisa Hospital (Hlabisa)
Ladysmith Hospital
Lenmed Howick Private Hospital
Life Hilton Private Hospital 
Lower Umfolozi War Memorial Hospital
Manguzi Hospital (Kwangwanase)
Mosvold Hospital (Ingwavuma)
Mseleni Hospital
Richmond Hospital (specialising in TB)
St Apollinaris Hospital (Creighton)
Umzimkhulu Hospital
Vryheid Hospital

Limpopo
Polokwane
Mediclinic Limpopo
Polokwane Hospital

Other 

Botlokwa Hospital
Curamed Thabazimbi Hospital
Dilokong Hospital
Donald Fraser Hospital (Vhufulwi)
Dr CN Phatudi Hospital
Duiwelskloof Hospital
Elim Hospital
Ellisras Hospital
Evuxakeni Hospital
FH Odendaal Hospital
George Masebe Hospital
Groblersdal Hospital
Hayani Hospital
Helene Franz hospital
Jane Furse Hospital
Kgapane Hospital
Lebowakgomo Hospital
Letaba Hospital
Louis Trichard Hospital
Malamulele Hospital
Mankweng Hospital 
Maphutha L Malatji Hospital
Matlala Hospital (Marblehall)
Marapong Medi-Clinic
Mecklenburg Hospital
Messina Hospital
Mokopane Hospital
Netcare Pholoso Hospital/Private Hospital (Polokwane)
Nkhensani Hospital
Philadelphia Hospital 
Sekororo Hospital
Seshego Hospital
Shiluvana Hospital
Siloam Hospital
St Rita's Hospital
Thabamoopo Hospital
Thabazimbi Hospital
Tshilidzini Hospital
Tzaneen Private Hospital
Van Velden Hospital
Voortrekker Hospital
Warmbad Hospital
WF Knobel Hospital
Witpoort Hospital
Zebediela Hospital
Zoutpansberg Private Hospital

Mpumalanga
Mbombela (Nelspruit
Lowveld Day Hospital
Mediclinic Nelspruit
Rob Ferreira Provincial Hospital
Kiaat Private Hospital

Witbank (eMalahleni)
Life Cosmos Hospital
Witbank Provincial Hospital

Other 

Barberton Hospital
Delmas Hospital
Embhuleni Hospital
Ermelo Provincial Hospital 
Kwa-Mhlanga Hospital
Mapulaneng Hospital
Matikwana Hospital (Mkhuhlu)
Mediclinic Barberton
Mediclinic Ermelo
Mediclinic Highveld (Trichardt)
Mediclinic Secunda
Middelburg Provincial Hospital
Midmed Hospital (Middelburg)
Mmametlhake Hospital
Piet Retief Hospital
Seboche Hospital
Shongwe Hospital
Themba Provincial Hospital
Tintswalo Hospital
Tonga Hospital

Northern Cape
Kimberley
Kimberley Hospital Complex
Mediclinic Kimberley

Other

Abraham Esau Hospital (Calvinia)
Barkly West Hospital
Carnarvon Hospital (Carnarvon)
Mediclinic Kathu
Tshwaragano Community Hospital 
Kuruman District Hospital 
Upington Medi-Clinic
Gordonia Hospital (Upington)
B J Kempen Memorial Hospital (Victoria West)

Dr Harry Surtie Hospital (Upington)

North West 
Klerksdorp

Anncron Clinic
Klerksdorp Provincial Hospital
Sunningdale Private Hospital
Wilmed Private Hospital

Other

Duff Scott Hospital (Mine Hospital), (Stilfontein)
Ferncrest Private Hospital (Thlabane)
Fochville Private Hospital
Legae Private Clinic (Mabopane)
Leslie Williams Private Hospital (Carletonville)
Mediclinic Brits (Brits)
Mediclinic Potchefstroom (Potchefstroom)
Moses Kotane Hospital (Ledig)
Potchefstroom Provincial Hospital
Peglerae Private Hospital (Rustenburg)
MEDCARE- (Rustenburg)
Mahikeng Provincial Hospital
Victoria Private Hospital (Mafikeng)
Vryburg Private Hospital 
Western Deep Levels Hospital (Carletonville)
Westvaal Hospital (Mine Hospital), (Orkney)

Western Cape

Cape Metropole 

Alexandra Hospital
Akeso Kenilworth Psychiatric Hospital
Akeso Milnerton Psychiatric Hospital
Akeso Montrose Manor Psychiatric Hospital (Cape Town)
Akeso Stepping Stones Psychiatric Hospital (Kommetjie)
Brooklyn Chest Hospital
Cape Eye Hospital (Bellville)
DP Marais Hospital (Cape Town)
Eerste River Hospital
False Bay Hospital (Fish Hoek)
Groote Schuur Hospital (Cape Town)
GF Jooste Hospital (Athlone)
Helderberg Hospital (Somerset West)
Karl Bremer Hospital (Bellville)
Khayelitsha Hospital
Lentegeur Psychiatric Hospital (Mitchells Plain)
Life Kingsbury Hospital (Cape Town)
Life Peninsula Eye Hospital (Cape Town)
Maitland Cottage Home
Mediclinic Cape Gate (Brackenfell)
Mediclinic Cape Town
Mediclinic Constantiaberg (Cape Town)
Mediclinic Durbanville
Mediclinic Louis Leipoldt (Bellville)
Mediclinic Milnerton
Mediclinic Panorama
Mediclinic Strand
Mediclinic Vergelegen (Somerset West)
Melomed Bellville 
Melomed Claremont
Melomed Gatesville
Melomed Mitchells Plain 
Melomed Tokai
Mowbray Active Birth Unit
Netcare Blaauwberg (Blouberg)
Netcare Christiaan Barnard Memorial Hospital (Cape Town)
Netcare Kuils River 
Netcare N1 City (Goodwood)
Nurture Cape View Physical Rehabilitation Hospital (Goodwood)
Nurture Newlands Physical Rehabilitation Hospital (Private)
Nurture Harmony Recovery and Wellness Facility (Hout Bay)
Red Cross War Memorial Children's Hospital (Cape Town)
Rondebosch Medical Centre	
Somerset Hospital (Cape Town)
Southern Cross Hospital (Cape Town)
Spescare Helderberg Sub-Acute Hospital (Strand)
Stikland Psychiatric Hospital
Tygerberg Hospital (Parow)
Valkenberg Psychiatric Hospital (Cape Town)
Victoria Hospital (Cape Town)
Vincent Pallotti Hospital (Cape Town)

George 
George Hospital
Mediclinic George

Hermanus
Hermanus Hospital
Mediclinic Hermanus

Mossel Bay
Life Bay View Hospital 
Mosselbaai Hospital

Knysna
Knysna Hospital
Knysna Private Hospital

Paarl
Mediclinic Paarl
Paarl Hospital
Sonstraal TB Hospital
Spescare Paarl Sub-Acute Hospital

Stellenbosch
Mediclinic Stellenbosch
Stellenbosch Hospital

Worcester
Brewelskoof TB Hospital
Eben Donges Hospital
Mediclinic Worcester

Other 

Beaufort West Hospital
Ceres Hospital
Citrusdal Hospital
Clanwilliam Hospital
Lapa Munnik Hospital
Mediclinic Klein Karoo (Oudtshoorn)
Mediclinic Plettenberg Bay
Montague Hospital
Otto du Plessis Hospital
Oudtshoorn Hospital
Riversdale Hospital
Robertson Hospital
St Joseph's Home
Swartland Hospital
Swellendam Hospital
Vredenburg Hospital
Vredendal Hospital
Wesfleur Hospital

References

 
Hospitals
South Africa
South Africa